Gustavo Henrique Alves Rodrigues (born 2 May 1999), commonly known as Gustavo Henrique, is a Brazilian footballer who plays as a forward for Portuguese club Estrela da Amadora on loan from Grêmio Anápolis.

Career statistics

Club

References

1999 births
Sportspeople from Goiás
Living people
Brazilian footballers
Association football forwards
Trindade Atlético Clube players
Grêmio Esportivo Anápolis players
S.C. Braga players
Anápolis Futebol Clube players
F.C. Penafiel players
C.F. Estrela da Amadora players
Liga Portugal 2 players
Brazilian expatriate footballers
Brazilian expatriate sportspeople in Portugal
Expatriate footballers in Portugal